The Tioga Bentonites are a series of ash bed layers occurring in three Sedimentary basins in the eastern and midwestern United States. The primary basin they are found in is the Appalachian Basin, as well as the Illinois Basin and the Michigan Basin. Due to an unconformity these ash beds are not present in the Sothern Appalachians..

Description 

There are 7–15 layers of ash depending on the location covering ~30 million years. These numerous layer are broken down into 4 clusters.  The Bald Hill K-bentonites are located in the Kalkberg Formation or New Scotland Formation were deposited 417.6 million years ago. The Sprout Brook K-bentonites are located in the Esopus Formation or Needmore Shale deposited 408.3 million years ago.  One cluster called the Tioga Middle Coarse Zone (MCZ) is located in the Onondaga Group deposited 391.4 million years ago. Finally Tioga A-G K-bentonites are located in the Onodaga Group and the Union Springs Member of the Marcellus Formation deposited 390.0 million years ago.

The volcanic ash was deposited in sea water. After sedimentation covered these beds the ash was slowly converted to a meta-Bentonite called Illite.  These layers are important because they allow very precise dating of the ash bed with K–Ar dating.  Potassium 40 decays at a know rate into Argon 40. Argon is an inert gas. It is relapsed from the rock once it is molten so once the rock or ash solidifies the clock is rest. So when the ration between K40 and Ar40 is measured the more Ar40 is trap in the rock compared to K40 the older the rock is

References 

Geologic formations of the United States
Sedimentary basins of North America